The men's 800 metres T34 event at the 2020 Summer Paralympics in Tokyo, took place between 3 and 4 September 2021.

Records
Prior to the competition, the existing records were as follows:

Results

Heats
Heat 1 took place on 3 September 2021, at 11:29:

Heat 2 took place on 3 September 2021, at 11:36:

Final
The final took place on 4 September 2021, at 9:55:

References

Men's 800 metres T34
2021 in men's athletics